The 1991 Monmouth by-election was a by-election held for the British House of Commons constituency of Monmouth in Wales on 16 May 1991.  It was won by the Labour Party candidate Huw Edwards.

Vacancy
The seat had become vacant when the sitting Conservative Member of Parliament (MP), Sir John Stradling Thomas had died at the age of 65 on 29 March 1991. He had held the seat since the 1970 general election.

Electoral history

Candidates
The Conservative candidate was 44-year-old Roger Evans. The Labour Party candidate was 38-year-old Huw Edwards.

Result
The result was a victory for the Labour candidate, Huw Edwards, who took the seat on a swing of 12.6%.

However, he was unseated at the 1992 general election by his defeated Conservative opponent Roger Evans, who held the seat until Edwards regained it in the Labour landslide at the 1997 general election.

See also
Monmouth
1934 Monmouth by-election
1939 Monmouth by-election
1945 Monmouth by-election
List of United Kingdom by-elections

Notes

References 

By-elections to the Parliament of the United Kingdom in Welsh constituencies
1991 in Wales
1990s elections in Wales
1991 elections in the United Kingdom
Elections in Monmouthshire
History of Monmouth, Wales
20th century in Monmouthshire